Fred Harrison may refer to:

 Fred Harrison (Australian footballer) (1893–1979), Australian rules footballer
 Fred Harrison (author) (born 1944), British author and economic commentator
 Fred Harrison (businessman),  Australian businessman, CEO of Ritchies Stores
 Fred Harrison (footballer, born 1880) (1880–1969), English footballer 
 Fred Harrison (rugby league), English rugby league footballer who played in the 1910s 
 Frederic Harrison (1831–1923), British historian
 Frederick Harrison (railway manager) (1844–1914), British army officer and railway manager
 Frederick Harrison (priest) (1909–?), dean of Belize
 Frederick E. Harrison (1876–1962), Canadian politician